Running Out may refer to:

 "Running Out" (Matoma and Astrid S song)
 "Running Out", by Juliana Hatfield, from the album Bed
 "Running Out" (Scissor Sisters song), from the album Night Work